The 2013 Judo Grand Prix Qingdao was held in Qingdao, China, from 31 October to 1 November 2013.

Medal summary

Men's events

Women's events

Source Results

Medal table

References

External links
 

2013 IJF World Tour
2013 Judo Grand Prix
Judo
Judo competitions in China
Judo
Judo
Judo